“What It Was, Was Football” is a monologue by actor-comedian Andy Griffith. The monologue is a description of a college football game, as seen by a naive country preacher who attends the game by accident and is entirely puzzled by it.

Production
According to radio host Dr. Demento, What It Was, Was Football was originally an old vaudeville routine that Griffith, who claimed to have improvised the routine shortly before its first performance, "may have heard ... and subconsciously drawn inspiration from".

At Griffith's request, Milton Alderfer (who was only 19 at the time), recorded and produced the original master tape in Greensboro, North Carolina. The master was then sent to Chapel Hill, North Carolina and mass-produced by the Colonial Records label in late 1953. Soon, after Colonial had sold nearly 50,000 copies of the record, Capitol Records took over distribution and ultimately sold nearly 800,000 copies. It also shot into the Top 10 in the Billboard record charts, peaking at #9 in February 1954. 

What It Was, Was Football (which remains one of the biggest-selling comedy records of all time) was instrumental in launching Griffith's career in television, stage, and film. On the original single, the monologue is credited to "Deacon Andy Griffith."

Griffith made an appearance on The Ed Sullivan Show in 1954, in large part due to the popularity of the record.

What It Was, Was Football was printed in Mad magazine in 1958, with illustrations by artist George Woodbridge. Most of the text of the recording is printed verbatim with faithful renderings of Griffith's accent as heard on the recording; however, Griffith's original climactic description of "the awfullest fight that I have ever seen...in my life!" is moved to an earlier position in the printed version. Also, while the original recording makes no direct reference to a specific university as a setting for the game witnessed, the illustrations in the Mad version refer to both the Ivy League and University of Notre Dame. Due to licensing issues, this adaptation had to be omitted from the Totally MAD CD-ROM collection of the magazine's run.

In 1987, Griffith made an appearance on The Tonight Show. During the interview, guest host Bill Cosby told Griffith that he had purchased Griffith's recording of What It Was, Was Football. Cosby then told Griffith that he had performed it at school and received an A, much to Griffith's surprise and delight.
  
In 1997, the monologue was made into a short film.

References

External links
YouTube: What it Was, Was Football

Monologues
Colonial Records
Spoken word
1953 singles
Comedy albums by American artists
Spoken word albums by American artists
Capitol Records singles